Jaan Lattik (22 October [O.S. 10 October] 1878 near , Estonia – 27 June 1967 in Stockholm, Sweden) was an Estonian politician, writer and a former Estonian Minister of Education and Minister of Foreign Affairs of Estonia.

Lattik was a pastor by profession and studied theology at Tartu University. He was also a writer of children's stories, which were written in a Võro dialect from southern Estonia. Lattik was a member of the Estonian delegation to the League of Nations in 1921. In 1925 he became minister of education and Estonian foreign minister between 1928 and 1931. He was envoy to Lithuania from September, 1939, recalled to Estonia on July 1940. He fled to Sweden in 1944, following the second Soviet occupation of Estonia. He lived in Sweden for the remainder of his life.

In late 2008, Lattik's body was reburied to Viljandi's Old Graveyard in accordance with his relatives' wishes.

In 1932 his daughter Helice Alice (1911–1988) married Viktor, the son of Estonian statesman Konstantin Päts.

References

1878 births
1967 deaths
People from Valga Parish
People from Kreis Werro
Estonian Lutheran clergy
Christian People's Party (Estonia) politicians
National Centre Party (Estonia) politicians
Ministers of Foreign Affairs of Estonia
Education ministers of Estonia
Members of the Estonian Constituent Assembly
Members of the Riigikogu, 1920–1923
Members of the Riigikogu, 1923–1926
Members of the Riigikogu, 1926–1929
Members of the Riigikogu, 1929–1932
Members of the Riigikogu, 1932–1934
Envoys of Estonia
Estonian World War II refugees
Estonian emigrants to Sweden
Refugees in Sweden
Burials at Skogskyrkogården